The 2009 IIHF World U18 Championship Division I was an international under-18 ice hockey competition organised by the International Ice Hockey Federation. Both Division I tournaments made up the second level of the 2009 IIHF World U18 Championships. The Group A tournament was played in Minsk, Belarus, and the Group B tournament was played in Asiago, Italy. Belarus and Latvia won the Group A and B tournaments respectively and gained promotion to the Top Division of the 2010 IIHF World U18 Championships.

Group A
The Group A tournament was played in Minsk, Belarus at the Ice Palace from 6 to 12 April 2009.

Final Standings

 is promoted to Top Division  for the 2010 IIHF World U18 Championships 
 is relegated to Division II for the 2010 IIHF World U18 Championships

Results

All times local

Group B
The Group B tournament was played in Asiago, Italy at PalaOdegar from 29 March to 4 April 2009.

Final Standings

 is promoted to Top Division  for the 2010 IIHF World U18 Championships 
 is relegated to Division II for the 2010 IIHF World U18 Championships

Results

All times local

Leading scorers

Top goaltenders

See also
2009 IIHF World U18 Championships
2009 IIHF World U18 Championship Division II
2009 IIHF World U18 Championship Division III

External links
Official results and statistics from the International Ice Hockey Federation
Division I – Group A
Division I – Group B

I
2009
2009
IIHF World U18 Championship Division I